Manhattan Chase is an action-adventure video game video game released in 2005 for Microsoft Windows. The game features a choice between two related storylines, both with female protagonists, with each on opposite sides of the law. The two characters that can be selected are Angel, who is described as having a "hard and hostile approach towards thugs and is as tough as they come", and Yasmin, a "cold, hard woman with an heart (sic) of ice".

Reception
Just Press Play gave the game a .5 score, criticizing the graphics, physics, gameplay, and storyline.

References

External links
Manhattan Chase at MobyGames

2005 video games
Action-adventure games
Video games featuring female protagonists
Video games about police officers
Video games developed in the Netherlands
Video games set in New York City
Windows games
Windows-only games
Team6 Game Studios games